Radin, known under his full name as Radin Butković, was a clergyman who served as gost of the Bosnian Church during the 15th century in medieval Bosnia.

Radin was probably born in Seonica, village near town of Konjic in Bosnia and Herzegovina, around 1400.

As a high-ranking prelate of the Bosnian Church, a diplomat and ambassador, he served as s court adviser and a court chaplain for the Grand Duke of Bosnia, Stjepan Vukčić, and resided in Seonica, Prača, Blagaj, and Dubrovnik, at the times.

As his vernacular name suggests, he was a local cleric and was chosen by Bosnians themselves.

Radin's Testament

References

Bibliography

 
 

Bosnian Church
15th-century Bosnian people
Bosnian Church clergy